Yasim Mohamed may refer to
 Yasim Abdi Mohamed, former Somali-Canadian terror suspect in the 2006 Ontario terrorism plot (cleared of charges)
 Yasim Muhammed Basardah, former Yemeni detainee at Guantanamo Bay
 Yasin Mohamed, one of the leaders of the Red Sea Afar Democratic Organisation (RSADO), a rebel group in Eritrea